Cyperus semifertilis is a species of sedge that is native to parts of north eastern Australia.

See also 
 List of Cyperus species

References 

semifertilis
Plants described in 1939
Flora of Queensland
Taxa named by Stanley Thatcher Blake